The 2018–19 Ohio Valley Conference men's basketball season began with practices in October 2018, followed by the start of the 2018–19 NCAA Division I men's basketball season in November. Conference play began in January 2019 and concludes in February 2019. The season marked the 70th season of Ohio Valley Conference basketball.

Preseason

Preseason poll 
Source

() first place votes

Preseason All-Conference Teams 
Source

OVC Preseason Player of the Year: Dylan Windler (Belmont)

Regular season

Conference matrix

Season summary & highlights

Conference regular season

Midseason watchlists

Postseason

Ohio Valley Tournament

Highlights

NCAA Tournament

National Invitation Tournament

Awards and honors

References